CICA may refer to:

 Canadian Institute of Chartered Accountants
 Comité Internacional de Críticos de Arquitectura (International Committee of Architectural Critics)
 Commission to Inquire into Child Abuse or Ryan Commission, Ireland, 1999-2009
 Conference on Interaction and Confidence-Building Measures in Asia
 Context Inspired Component Architecture, a data architecture Standard; see ASC X12
 Competition in Contracting Act, US law on federal procurement
 Criminal Injuries Compensation Authority, UK
 CICA-DT, TV station of TVOntario, Canada